Frankie Newton (William Frank Newton, January 4, 1906 – March 11, 1954) was an American jazz trumpeter from Emory, Virginia, United States. He played in several New York City bands in the 1920s and 1930s, including those led by Sam Wooding, Chick Webb, Charlie Barnet, Andy Kirk and Charlie "Fess" Johnson. In the 1940s, he played with bands led by Lucky Millinder and Pete Brown. He played in clubs in New York and Boston, with musicians such as pianist Art Tatum, pianist James P. Johnson, drummer Sid Catlett and clarinetist Edmond Hall.

He accompanied Bessie Smith on her final recordings (November 24, 1933), Maxine Sullivan on 'Loch Lomond', and Billie Holiday on her original "Strange Fruit" session in 1939.

Between March 1937 and August 1939, eight recording sessions issued under Newton's name were produced.  Three sessions in 1937 were made for Irving Mills's Variety label.  In 1939, Newton recorded a six-song session with Victor, a four-song session for Vocalion, two individual one-song sessions for Blue Note, and finally one two-song session for Vocalion—14 records in all.

He also played with Art Tatum on extended versions of "Sweet Georgia Brown" and "Oh, Lady Be Good!", recorded in Harlem after hours. These finally came out in 1973 as part of Tatum's album God Is in the House, first on LP and later on CD.

Politically, Newton was known to be a communist. In homage, the communist historian Eric Hobsbawn wrote jazz criticism for the New Statesman under the pen name "Francis Newton".

References

1906 births
1954 deaths
American jazz trumpeters
American male trumpeters
Vocalion Records artists
20th-century American musicians
American communists
20th-century trumpeters
American male jazz musicians
Mills Blue Rhythm Band members
20th-century American male musicians